Trei culori was the national anthem of the Socialist Republic of Romania from 1977 to 1990. On 24 January 1990, after the Romanian Revolution, it was officially replaced by "Deșteaptă-te, române!". Before 1977, the national anthem was "E scris pe tricolor Unire".

"Trei culori" is based on a Romanian patriotic song written and composed by Ciprian Porumbescu. The original lyrics twice underwent non-credited revisions in order to reflect the country's Communist doctrine, and parallels between past and present glories. This was unlike one of the previous anthems, "Te slăvim, Românie", a text mentioning Romania's brotherhood with the Soviet Union, and praises of the Leninist ideology were consciously not included, emphasising a more national communist character of the state.

The title refers to the national flag of Romania, which is a blue-yellow-red tricolour. It has not undergone major changes. Only the distribution of the colors (in point of proportion and position) was changed to a certain extent, being made equal after the abortive Romanian revolution of 1848. The Romanian principalities were among the many European states during that time that were inspired by the French revolutionary spirit to make a dimensionally standardized tricolour banner as their national flag.

The song continued as the national anthem for around a month after the overthrow of the Socialist Republic, but with Porumbescu's original patriotic lyrics.

Lyrics

References

External links
Sound file (mp3)
Trei culori music

Socialist Republic of Romania
Historical national anthems
National symbols of Romania
Romanian patriotic songs
European anthems
Romanian-language songs